Jean-Edouard (or Jean-Edward) de Castella (1881 in Lilydale, Australia – 1966 in Fribourg), was a Swiss painter and illustrator .

Biography 
Born in Australia in 1881, Jean-Edouard de Castella moved to Switzerland with his father Hubert de Castella and his family in 1886. He was a descendant of the Seigneurs de Castella, a noble family from Gruyère. He was the nephew of Paul de Castella and Lilly de Castella. In 1901 he entered the Academy of Fine Arts in Munich where he met Paul Klee with whom he then travels to Italy. He attended Ferdinand Hodler's classes together with his sister Nathalie at the Technicum in Fribourg where he studied with Raymond Buchs, Hiram Brülhart or Oswald Pilloud.

In 1903 he went to the Académie Julian in Paris. He regularly attended the Salon fribourgeois of the Swiss Society of Painters, Sculptors and Architects. In 1932 he created an art gallery in Fribourg, the Salon d'art permanent du Capitole where he mainly exhibits works by Swiss artists. This was unfortunately not as successful as he expected and the gallery closed two years later.

He made many stained glass windows for public buildings as well as churches. In 1918 he made a cycle of windows for the chapel of Our Lady of Bourguillon close to Fribourg. He then also collaborated with Alexandre Cingria and Eugène Dunand. He also illustrated fairy tales by Hans Christian Andersen and Perrault.

Works in public institutions 
 Art Nouveau stained glass windows for the chapel of Our Lady of Bourguillon (Fribourg), 1918.

References

 Hodler und Freiburg. Die Mission des Künstlers. Hodler et Fribourg. La Mission de l'artiste, exhibition catalogue, Musée d'Art et d'Histoire, Fribourg, 1981
 CLERC, Philippe, Un carrefour artistique, in: La Gruyère dans le miroir de son patrimoine, Une région en représentation, t.5, Editions Alphil, 2011, p. 14

External links 
 

1881 births
1966 deaths
20th-century Swiss painters
Swiss male painters
Art Nouveau painters
Art Nouveau illustrators
Swiss illustrators
Australian emigrants to Switzerland
Jean
People from Melbourne
People from Fribourg
Swiss nobility
20th-century Swiss male artists